Tim Twietmeyer (born  November 30, 1958) is an Auburn, California-based ultramarathon runner and an engineering manager at Hewlett Packard, in Roseville in the U.S. state of California.  Twietmeyer is also an accomplished mountain biker, road cyclist, and retired almost-scratch golfer and swimmer.  He is best known for his five victories and unprecedented 25 sub-24 hour finishes at the  Western States Endurance Run.

Western States 100 Miler
Twietmeyer is the only person to have completed the Western States Endurance Run more than 25 times in under 24 hours.  His five WS100 victories came in 1992, 1994–1996, and 1998.  In 2003, he completed an unprecedented 15 consecutive top-five finishes.

He has served for 10 years on the board of trustees and is the current president of the Western States Endurance Run Foundation.

Endurance
Beyond his WS100 exploits, Twietmeyer has won the Eagle  Run in Canada, and completed the Ultra-Trail du Mont-Blanc through France, Italy, and Switzerland.  He has completed over 200 marathon and ultramarathon races.

Career highlights
 Western States 100:  five-time champion; fifteen top-five finishes; master’s division course record holder (17:17); 25 sub-24-hour finishes
 First runner to complete the Tahoe Rim Trail (165 miles) in under two days
 42-time finisher of the American River 50 Mile Run
 29- time finisher of the California International Marathon
 1997 champion and course record holder of The Eagle 100-Mile Run, Penticton, British Columbia
 Winner of several 50-mile and 50-kilometer races, including the Jed Smith 50K and Pueblo Nuevo 50-Miler
 Seven wins at the California 50-Mile Endurance Run

Personal life

Tim and his wife, Kathy, have three sons.

External links
 AuburnJournal.com - 'A running king takes one last lap:  Twietmeyer says it's his final WS 100 race, though his career goes on' Mark DeVaughn, Auburn Journal (June 23, 2006)
 TheNorthFace.com - 'Tim Twietmeyer', The North Face

1958 births
Living people
American male ultramarathon runners
Sportspeople from Roseville, California